KEQI-LD (channel 22) is a low-power television station in Dededo, Guam, serving the U.S. territory as an affiliate of the Fox network. It is owned by Sorensen Media Group alongside ABC affiliate KTGM (channel 14). Both stations share studios on 111 Chalan Santo Papa in Hagåtña (Agana), while KEQI-LD's transmitter is located in the heights of Barigåda (Barrigada).

KEQI-LD's signal can be seen over the air in Hagåtña (Agana), Tamuneng (Tamuning), and Dededo. Its programming is also available island-wide on KTGM's second digital subchannel, on cable channel 6 on MCV Broadband and GTA's GUdTV systems in Guam, and on cable channel 10 on MCV Broadband in the Northern Mariana Islands.

Programming

Originally KEQI-LP, the station signed on the air on December 17, 2004, and has been owned by Sorensen Media Group since its inception. It broadcast as an independent station until picking up the Fox network affiliation on September 1, 2005. Prior to this, Fox had only been carried as a secondary affiliation, first on NBC affiliate KUAM-TV, then on KTGM (which Sorensen acquired in November 2005) from 1990 onward, until near the end of the decade, when KTGM dropped it to focus on ABC programming. After this, local cable systems carried San Francisco Bay Area affiliate KTVU before the network affiliated with KEQI-LP.

The station airs a mix of Fox network programming and syndicated fare. It also airs the Fox primetime schedule on the same week as the continental United States, except that shows are aired on a Tuesday-through-Monday pattern rather than the Monday-through-Sunday pattern, since Guam is a day ahead of the United States. This does not apply to live sports, which mainly air live early in the morning.

KEQI-LD's syndicated programming includes Entertainment Tonight and Inside Edition. These same programs are also repeated on KTGM.

In 2008, the station added news programming from the Philippines, using content from ABS-CBN and its sister news cable channel ANC through The Filipino Channel, throughout the day when they do not air any Fox programming. KEQI-LD also airs radio simulcasts of several KGUM talk shows with live studio cams.

See also
Channel 6 branded TV stations in the United States
Channel 22 digital TV stations in the United States
Channel 22 low-power TV stations in the United States
Channel 22 virtual TV stations in the United States

External links
Official website
Pacific News Center

EQI-LD
Fox network affiliates
ABS-CBN stations
Television channels and stations established in 2004
Low-power television stations in the United States
2004 establishments in Guam